Cotleigh is a village and civil parish near Honiton in Devon, England. It is surrounded clockwise from the north by the parishes of Upottery, Stockland, Offwell and Monkton. In the 19th century the rector of Cotleigh Devon was also rector of Barwick, Somerset.

References

External links
 Village website

Villages in Devon